The second edition of the Copa América de Ciclismo was held on Sunday, 6 January 2002 in São Paulo, Brazil.

Results

References 
 cyclingnews
 andersonbicicletas

Copa América de Ciclismo
Copa
Copa
January 2002 sports events in South America